Welimada (වැලිමඩ)is a town in the Badulla District of the Uva Province of Sri Lanka.

Administration
The Welimada town  is now administered by the Welimada Divisional Council.
Notable government institutions include:
 Divisional Secretariat
 Police Station
 Government Hospital

Places of interest
Divurumwela Old Temple
Sthripura Cave 
Bomburu ella Waterfall 
Manabharana Waterfalls - Lunuwattha
Boralanda Dairy Farms
18th Railway Tunnel
Reservoir of Umaoya Project

Sthripura Cave
Sthripura Cave is located at Kiriwanagama about 16 km from Welimada. The Cave consists of a series of three caves. It is believed from the legend, The cave had been used by the King Ravana of Sri Lanka to hide the princess Sita. According to the Ramayana, princess Sita was abducted from her husband, Prince Rama of India.

Members of The Parliament
K. D. Sugathadasa 1947 - 1952 
M. B. Bambarapane 1952-1956 
K. M. P. Rajaratne 1956 -1965 
Percy Samaraweera (UNP) 1965-1970 and 1977-1987
R. M. Bandara 1970 -1977
S. A. R. Madduma Bandara (SLFP) 1989-1994 
Hema Rathnayake (PA) 1994 - 2000
Ravindra Samaraweera (UNP) 1987-1988
Ravindra Samaraweera (UNP) 2015–Present
Warusawitharana Pradeep Lakshan (Youth parliament member) 2015-2016
M.J Thuwan Kasim (Member of Youth Parliament) 2020

See also
Towns in Uva
History of Uva Province

References

Towns in Badulla District